Schmidt Peninsula may refer to:

Schmidt Peninsula (Antarctica)
Schmidt Peninsula (Sakhalin), Russia